The Russian Basketball Super League A 2007–08 was the 17th official season of Russian Basketball Super League A. In all there were 13 teams.

Regular season

Results

Relegation round

Standings

Results

Playoffs

Bracket

Classification 5–8 places

Individual leaders

Points

All Players

Only Russian Players

Rebounds

All Players

Only Russian Players

Assists

Transfer campaign

 
 
2007–08 in European basketball leagues